Piezo-type mechanosensitive ion channel component 2 is a protein that in humans is encoded by the PIEZO2 gene. It has a homotrimeric structure, with three blades curving into a nano-dome, with a diameter of 28 nanometers.

Function 

Piezos are large transmembrane proteins conserved among various species, all having between 24 and 36 predicted transmembrane domains. 'Piezo' comes from the Greek 'piesi,' meaning 'pressure.' The PIEZO2 protein has a role in rapidly adapting mechanically activated (MA) currents in somatosensory neurons. Its structure is resolved via a mouse version in 2019, showing the predicted homotrimeric propeller.

PIEZO2 is typically found in tissues that respond to physical touch, such as Merkel cells, and is thought to regulate light touch response.

Pathology 
 Gain-of-function mutations in the mechanically activated ion channel PIEZO2 cause a subtype of Distal Arthrogryposis.
 Mice without PIEZO2 in their proprioceptive neurons show uncoordinated body movements, indicating that PIEZO2 plays a role in mammalian proprioception.
 PIEZO2 mutations link Gordon syndrome (distal arthrogryposis type 3), Marden-Walker syndrome and Arthrogryposis (Distal Arthrogryposis Type 5).

See also
 PIEZO1

References

Further reading